Gårda BK is a Swedish football club located in Gothenburg. The club, formed 1 November 1919, currently plays in a local league. The club has played eight seasons in the highest Swedish league, Allsvenskan. Gårda BK are affiliated to the Göteborgs Fotbollförbund.

Achievements 
Allsvenskan:
Best placement (5th): 1937–38, 1938–39

Season to season 

In their early history Gårda BK competed in the following divisions:

In recent seasons Gårda BK have competed in the following divisions:

Attendances

In recent seasons Gårda BK have had the following average attendances:

Records 
 Highest attendance, Gamla Ullevi: 26,178 vs. IK Brage, 31 October 1937

Footnotes

External links 
Gårda BK – official site

 
Allsvenskan clubs
Association football clubs established in 1919
Football clubs in Gothenburg
1919 establishments in Sweden
Football clubs in Västra Götaland County